Renzo Finelli (born 24 August 1945) is an Italian former middle distance runner.  He won one medal, at senior level, at the International athletics competitions.

Biography
He competed in the 1968 Summer Olympics.

National championships
Renzo Finelli has won 3 times the individual national championship.
1 win in the 1500 metres (1971)
2 wins in the 5000 metres (1966, 1969)

References

External links
 

1945 births
Living people
Italian male middle-distance runners
Olympic athletes of Italy
Athletes (track and field) at the 1968 Summer Olympics
Mediterranean Games gold medalists for Italy
Athletes (track and field) at the 1967 Mediterranean Games
Mediterranean Games medalists in athletics